Darrell Zwerling (September 9, 1928 – April 11, 2014) was an American character actor in film and television. His most famous role was Hollis Mulwray, the unfortunate Water Authority Commissioner (the husband of Faye Dunaway's character) in Roman Polanski's Chinatown.  In 1973, he portrayed Mr. Charney, a voice-over applicant with laryngitis   at WJM-TV, in the season four episode, "The Lou and Edie Story" on The Mary Tyler Moore Show.

He was born in Pittsburgh, Pennsylvania to Irwin and Esther Zwerling, Jewish emigrants from Austria and Romania, respectively, and had one elder sibling, a sister, Bernice. Zwerling died in Hollywood, California on April 11, 2014, aged 85, from undisclosed causes. His death was not disclosed until September 16, 2014, by The Juilliard School in New York.

Filmography
Darrell appeared in many movies and on television.

References

External links
 Juilliard School  - In Memoriam
 Notice of death
 Picture of gravestone

1928 births
2014 deaths
20th-century American male actors
American male film actors
American male television actors
American people of Austrian-Jewish descent
American people of Romanian-Jewish descent
Jewish American male actors
Male actors from Pittsburgh
Doc Savage
Burials at Hillside Memorial Park Cemetery